The 2014–15 Mestis season was the 15th season of the Mestis, the second level of ice hockey in Finland. 10 teams participated in the league, and Jukurit won the championship. Kokkolan Hermes and Jokipojat were promoted to the Mestis league from the Suomi-sarja league for 2015-16.

Regular season

Playoffs

External links
 Official website 
 Oddsportal.com
 EliteProspects.com

Fin
2014–15 in Finnish ice hockey
Mestis seasons